Cristina Favre-Moretti, née Moretti (born 26 August 1963) is a Swiss ski mountaineer, long-distance runner and mountain biker. Her twin sister Isabella Crettenand-Moretti also competes in endurance sport events.

Selected results

Ski mountaineering 
 1998:
 1st and course record, Tour de Matterhorn (together with Catherine Mabillard and Sandra Zimmerli)
 2003:
 1st, European Championship single race
 1st, European Championship team race (together with Catherine Mabillard)
 1st, European Championship combination ranking
 1st, Dolomiti Cup team (together with Catherine Mabillard)
 2004:
 1st, World Championship single race
 1st, World Championship vertical race)
 1st, World Championship team race (together with Catherine Mabillard)
 1st, World Championship relay race (together with Catherine Mabillard and Isabella Crettenand-Moretti)
 1st, World Championship combination ranking
 1st, Transcavallo race team
 1st, Trophée des Gastlosen, together with Isabella Crettenand-Moretti
 2005:
 1st, European Championship single race
 1st, European Championship vertical race
 1st, European Championship team race (together with Isabella Favre-Moretti)
 1st, European Championship relay race (together with Isabella Crettenand-Moretti and Gabrielle Magnenat)
 1st, European Championship combination ranking

Trofeo Mezzalama 

 2003: 1st, together with Chiara Raso and Arianna Follis

Pierra Menta 

 2004: 1st, together with Catherine Mabillard
 2005: 1st, together with Isabella Crettenand-Moretti

Patrouille des Glaciers 

 1998: 1st and course record, together with Catherine Mabillard and Sandra Zimmerli
 2000: 1st, together with Catherine Mabillard and Sandra Zimmerli
 2004: 1st, together with Catherine Mabillard and Isabella Crettenand-Moretti
 2008: 3rd, together with Catherine Mabillard and Isabella Crettenand-Moretti

Mountain biking 
 2002: 1st, Grand Raid Cristalp, 76 km course

Running 
 2010:
 1st, Iron-Terrific, Crans-Montana

References 

1963 births
Living people
Swiss female ski mountaineers
World ski mountaineering champions
Swiss female long-distance runners
Swiss mountain bikers
Swiss female cyclists